The Burmese Wikipedia is the Burmese language edition of the free online encyclopedia Wikipedia.

History

Timeline
2004: Burmese Wikipedia launched.
2005: Some of Burmese Wikipedians joined and started writing.
2008: Content grew drastically.
2010: First Burmese Wikipedia workshop held at Bangkok, Thailand with people from Wikimedia Foundation, local and international Unicode experts and Burmese Wikipedians.
2012: Burmese Wikipedia was introduced at Barcamp Yangon.

Events and promotions

The Myanmar Computer Professionals Association had launched Wikipedia Myanmar project with the aim of expanding Wikipedia in 2010.

The Burmese Wikipedia community had held their first joint workshop in Yangon, Burma (Myanmar) with the help of Telenor Myanmar in June 2014 to recruit new volunteers. The Burmese Wikipedia Forum was held at Dagon University in July 2014 attracting over 2,000 people, including students.

Challenges
The majority of Burmese internet users used the non-Unicode Zawgyi font so they have difficulty viewing Burmese Wikipedia before 2019.

References

External links
  Burmese Wikipedia
  Burmese Wikipedia mobile version

 
 

Wikipedias by language
Internet properties established in 2004
Burmese encyclopedias